Mont Gelé, "frozen mount" in French, may refer to the following mountains

 Mont Gelé (Riddes) above Riddes/Verbier, Valais, Switzerland
 Mont Gelé (Bagnes) on the border between Bagnes, Valais in Switzerland and Valle d'Aosta in Italy

See also
 Gele Mountain, Geleshan National Forest Park, near Chongqing, China